Craig Bellamy (born 3 October 1959) is an Australian professional rugby league football coach who is the head coach of the Melbourne Storm in the NRL, and a former professional rugby league footballer. He is known as one of the greatest coaches in NRL history.

He has previously coached the New South Wales State of Origin team. Bellamy started his coaching career as assistant coach to Wayne Bennett at the Brisbane Broncos. He also writes a column for The Australian.

Bellamy played his entire NSWRL premiership career with the Canberra Raiders during the 1980s, and 1990s. In Canberra he played under the coaches Don Furner (1982–87), Wayne Bennett (1987), and Tim Sheens (1988–92). Injury midway through the 1987 season saw Bellamy miss the Raiders charge to their first ever Grand Final appearance which resulted in an 18–8 loss to the Manly-Warringah Sea Eagles. Bellamy played from the bench in Canberra's 18–14 win over Penrith in the 1990 Grand Final at the Sydney Football Stadium.

After a coaching apprenticeship as Wayne Bennett's assistant at the Brisbane Broncos, which included a win over the Wests Tigers with the "Baby Broncos" when Bennett and the teams stars were away on State of Origin duty. Bellamy was appointed head coach of the Melbourne Storm for the 2003 NRL season. There he has achieved great success; winning the 2007 Grand Final over Manly and the 2009 Grand Final over Parramatta, though both of these were later stripped due to extensive salary cap breaches. He also led the Storm to the minor premiership in 2011, and won his first legitimate premiership as a coach in 2012 when the Storm defeated the Canterbury-Bankstown Bulldogs. He was the coach of the New South Wales State of Origin team until he was sacked in 2010, the same year as the Storm's salary cap scandal, after three unrelenting seasons of disappointment which netted only two wins from nine matches.

Bellamy won his second recognized NRL premiership as coach with the Melbourne Storm after a dominant 2017 season in which the Storm lost only four games. In 2018 the Storm had a successful year making it to the 2018 NRL Grand Final before being beaten by the Sydney Roosters. He won his third NRL premiership with the Storm in 2020.

He has yet to coach a losing NRL season, maintaining a better than 50% win–loss ratio for each season he has coached. He has also never lost in round one of a season as coach.

Background
Bellamy was born 3 October 1959 in Portland, New South Wales, Australia.

Playing career
He played his early junior football for Portland Colts. Bellamy also played for Oberon Tigers in the Country Rugby League as a teenager before moving to Macquarie United in the Newcastle Rugby League in 1979.

The Canberra Raiders signed Bellamy in their début season, 1982. He played the majority of his career in the centres but was also used as a utility player, appearing at times as fullback, winger, five-eighth and lock. After the Raiders won the 1989 NSWRL season's Grand Final (which he wasn't selected for), Bellamy travelled with the Raiders to England for the 1989 World Club Challenge, but didn't play in the loss to Widnes at Old Trafford.

After winning the 1990 premiership with the Raiders, Bellamy spent 1991 with Turvey Park in Wagga Wagga as captain/coach in the Group 9 Competition, and also had a stint playing in England for Swinton, before returning to Canberra for one last year in 1992.

Coaching career

1990s
In 1995, Bellamy coached the Canberra Raiders' President's Cup team to a premiership win. In 1998 he became performance co-ordinator and assistant coach to Wayne Bennett at the Brisbane Broncos. That year they won the 1998 NRL Grand final.

2000s
In 2002, when Broncos' head coach Wayne Bennett was on State of Origin duty with the Queensland Maroons, Bellamy gained NRL experience as a head coach. Forced to field a team full of young players due to the regular side's representative commitments, the 'Baby Broncos' upset the Wests Tigers. The Tigers were a leading candidate to sign Bellamy as their coach for the 2003 season, although he ultimately joined Melbourne after Mark Murray was sacked. In his third season as an NRL coach with the Storm, Bellamy started coaching the Country Origin team with a loss in 2005. His work with Wayne Bennett extended to international level when he was appointed assistant to Bennett for the Australian Test team during the 2005 Rugby League Tri-Nations tournament, and was often seen 'running the water' to players on the field. Bellamy was considered a leading candidate to coach the Queensland Maroons in 2006, but his selection was opposed by many former players, including Arthur Beetson, and was ultimately vetoed due to the fact he was a New South Welshman. He coached New South Wales Country to victory and his club, Melbourne won the 2006 minor premiership and reached the 2006 National Rugby League grand final, but finished as runners-up to former mentor Bennett's Brisbane Broncos. In the post season Bellamy continued as Kangaroos assistant coach, now under Ricky Stuart for the 2006 Tri Nations series. The following season Country lost but the Storm were minor premiers and reached the 2007 NRL grand final, in which they defeated the Manly Warringah Sea Eagles 34–8 to become premiers. They were however later stripped of the title by the NRL.

In April, 2008, Bellamy signed a five-year contract extension through to 2013 with Melbourne despite interest from the Brisbane Broncos. This signing meant that Bellamy would become the first 10-year coach in the Storm's history. After the New South Wales Blues' poor showing in the 2007 State of Origin series, Bellamy was appointed as coach for the 2008 series. In his first series in charge of NSW, the Blues lost to Mal Meninga's Maroons 2 – 1. The second and third series have also resulted in series losses, therefore posing serious questions on Bellamy's abilities to coach at representative level.

During the finals campaign of the 2008 NRL season, Bellamy cost his club $50,000 after he was fined for disclosing scathing remarks and views on the NRL's decision to suspend his side's captain and goal-kicker, Cameron Smith over a controversial "grapple tackle" on Brisbane's Sam Thaiday. Bellamy claimed that the administration was corrupt and that bookkeepers already knew that Smith would be denied the opportunity to play for the rest of the season and furthermore along with Melbourne's CEO questioned the NRL's integrity in their opting to side-line Smith and not others who were guilty of committing similar tackles. This drew threats of legal action from the members of the NRL Judiciary.

Bellamy coached Melbourne to their 3rd successive NRL grand final, but could not repeat the feats of the previous year as his side suffered an enormous 40–0 defeat to Manly.

2009 marked the fourth consecutive year Melbourne played in the grand final under Bellamy. Melbourne also reached the top four on the NRL ladder for the fourth consecutive year. 
Craig Bellamy coached Melbourne in their grand final win in 2009 only to be stripped of the title due to breaching the salary cap.

Bellamy was named coach of the year at the 2009 RLIF awards.

2010s
Bellamy left as Blues coach after the 2010 State of Origin series which resulted in a 3-0 whitewash, the first in Origin and also the Blues' first since 2000. Ricky Stuart was later named his successor. So far the Storm had not missed the finals in Bellamy's seven seasons at the helm with the exception of 2010 when they were not allowed to earn any points due to their 2009 salary cap breach. Had they been allowed to accumulate points however they would have made the top 8 again. He took them to the minor premiership in 2011, just narrowly missing out on a spot in the grand final to a loss in the preliminary final to the New Zealand Warriors. He went one better in 2012, winning the 2012 NRL grand final against Canterbury 14–4. That year he also received the Rugby League International Federation's coach of the year award for the second time.

Despite speculation he would move to the Warriors or St George-Illawarra as coach, he signed a new three-year deal with Melbourne Storm in early 2013. He coached the team to victory in the 2013 World Club Challenge over Leeds, earning the title of world champions. Late in the 2013 NRL season during an interview with Paul Vautin for Channel 9's "The Footy show", it was revealed that Bellamy was an electrician by trade, though downplayed it by saying that he was "not a very good one." Also during 2013 Bellamy's book, Home Truths: On Life, Leadership, Adversity, Success and Failure was published.

On 16 May 2014 Bellamy reached a milestone, and created a new club record, of having coached the Melbourne Storm for 300 games.

On 4 March 2016, Bellamy extended his stay as Melbourne Storm coach to the end of 2018.

2020s

Craig Bellamy had coached the Melbourne Storm to yet another NRL Premiership title in 2020, defeating the Penrith Panthers 26–20. This was despite the impact of the COVID-19 pandemic, which had his players living away from home for five months straight.

Statistics

|-
|+ Craig Bellamy – coaching results by season
|-
! width="30"|Year
! Team
! width="30"|Games
! width="30"|Wins
! width="30"|Draws
! width="30"|Losses
! width="30"|Win %
! Notes
|-
| 2002|| style=text-align:left| Brisbane Broncos
|2||1||0||1||50%
|Coached two games while Wayne Bennett was on Origin duty
|- 
| 2003|| style=text-align:left| Melbourne Storm 
| 26|| 16|| 0|| 10|| 62%|| Lost 2003 NRL Semi Final against Canterbury Bulldogs
|-
| 2004|| style=text-align:left| Melbourne Storm 
| 26|| 14||  0|| 12|| 54%|| Lost 2004 NRL Semi Final against Canterbury Bulldogs
|-
| 2005|| style=text-align:left| Melbourne Storm 
| 26|| 14||  0|| 12|| 54%|| Lost 2005 NRL Semi Final against North Queensland Cowboys
|-
| 2006|| style=text-align:left| Melbourne Storm 
| 27|| 22|| 0|| 5|| 81%|| Lost 2006 NRL Grand Final against Brisbane Broncos
|-
| style="background:#FA8072;"|2007*|| style=text-align:left| Melbourne Storm 
| 27||  24|| 0|| 3|| 89%|| Won 2007 NRL Grand Final against Manly-Warringah Sea Eagles
|-
| 2008|| style=text-align:left| Melbourne Storm 
| 28||  19|| 0|| 9|| 68%|| Lost 2008 NRL Grand Final against Manly-Warringah Sea Eagles 
|-
| style="background:#FA8072;"|2009*|| style=text-align:left| Melbourne Storm 
| 27|| 17||  1|| 9|| 65%|| Won 2009 NRL Grand Final against Parramatta Eels
|-
| 2010|| style=text-align:left| Melbourne Storm 
| 24||  14|| 0|| 10|| 58%|| Finished 16th (out of 16) due to penalties from long-term salary cap breaches
|-
| 2011|| style=text-align:left| Melbourne Storm 
| 26|| 20|| 0|| 6|| 77%|| Lost 2011 NRL Preliminary Final against New Zealand Warriors
|-
| style="background:#D8BFD8;"|2012^|| style=text-align:left| Melbourne Storm 
| 27|| 20|| 0|| 7|| 74%|| Won 2012 NRL Grand Final against Canterbury-Bankstown Bulldogs
|-
| 2013|| style=text-align:left| Melbourne Storm 
| 26|| 16|| 1|| 9|| 64%|| Lost 2013 NRL Semi Final against Newcastle Knights
|-
| 2014|| style=text-align:left| Melbourne Storm 
| 25|| 14|| 0|| 11|| 56%|| Knocked out in Elimination final match by Canterbury-Bankstown Bulldogs
|-
| 2015|| style=text-align:left| Melbourne Storm 
| 26|| 15|| 0|| 11|| 58%|| Lost 2015 NRL Preliminary final against North Queensland Cowboys
|-
| 2016|| style=text-align:left| Melbourne Storm 
| 27|| 21|| 0|| 6|| 78%|| Lost 2016 NRL Grand Final against Cronulla-Sutherland Sharks
|-
| style="background:#D8BFD8;"|2017^|| style=text-align:left| Melbourne Storm 
| 27|| 23|| 0|| 4|| 85%|| Won 2017 NRL Grand Final against North Queensland Cowboys
|-
| 2018|| style=text-align:left| Melbourne Storm 
| 27|| 18|| 0|| 9|| 67%|| Lost 2018 NRL Grand Final against Sydney Roosters
|-
| 2019|| style=text-align:left| Melbourne Storm 
| 27|| 21|| 0|| 6|| 78%|| Lost 2019 Preliminary Final against Sydney Roosters
|-
| style="background:#D8BFD8;"|2020^|| style=text-align:left| Melbourne Storm 
| 23|| 18|| 0|| 5|| 78%|| Won 2020 NRL Grand Final against Penrith Panthers
|-
| 2021|| style=text-align:left| Melbourne Storm 
| 26|| 22|| 0|| 4|| 85%|| Lost 2021 Preliminary Final against Penrith Panthers
|- 
| 2022|| style=text-align:left| Melbourne Storm 
| 25|| 15|| 0|| 10|| 60%|| Knocked out in Elimination final match by Canberra Raiders
|- class="sortbottom"
! colspan=2| Career
!525
!365
!2
!158
!69.5%
!
|}

References

Sources

External links
Melbourne Storm profile

 

1959 births
Living people
Australian rugby league coaches
Australian rugby league players
Canberra Raiders players
Country New South Wales rugby league team coaches
Macquarie Scorpions players
Brisbane Broncos coaches
Melbourne Storm coaches
New South Wales Rugby League State of Origin coaches
Rugby league centres
Rugby league five-eighths
Rugby league locks
Rugby league players from New South Wales
Swinton Lions players